In mathematics, more specifically in differential geometry and geometric topology, the Milnor–Wood inequality is an obstruction to endow circle bundles over surfaces with a flat structure. It is named after John Milnor and John W. Wood.

Flat bundles 
For linear bundles, flatness is defined as the vanishing of the curvature form of an associated connection. An arbitrary smooth (or topological) d-dimensional fiber bundle is flat if it can be endowed with a foliation of codimension d that is transverse to the fibers.

The inequality 
The Milnor–Wood inequality is named after two separate results that were proven by John Milnor and John W. Wood. Both of them deal with orientable circle bundles over a closed oriented surface  of positive genus g.

Theorem (Milnor, 1958)  Let  be a flat oriented linear circle bundle. Then the Euler number of the bundle satisfies .

Theorem (Wood, 1971)  Let  be a flat oriented topological circle bundle. Then the Euler number of the bundle satisfies .

Wood's theorem implies Milnor's older result, as the homomorphism  classifying the linear flat circle bundle gives rise to a topological circle bundle via the 2-fold covering map , doubling the Euler number. 

Either of these two statements can be meant by referring to the Milnor–Wood inequality.

References 

Differential geometry
Geometric topology